Aramean Democratic Organization (Turoyo: M’takasto Suryayto Dimokratayto) also known as ArDO, was founded in 1988 and is an Aramean political party in Lebanon.
The Aramean Democratic Organization's goal is to reestablish Aramean independence and reconstituting the Aramean-Syriac Nation by reclaiming the heartland of the ancient ancestral homeland most of which lies within today's Syria and Lebanon.

Political Aims
To establish an independent democratic Aramean state on the land of Aram with Lebanon as a point of departure.

Objectives
 To build an opinion, on national as well as on international level, for the Aramean cause.
 Modern Syria to become a secular state "Where all groups should have equal rights regardless of who is the majority or the minority."
 To work for recapture the stolen geographical, historical and cultural rights of the Aramean people Through Recognition of ‘Aramean’ Nationality
 Through political and mass media efforts, work for the foundation of an Aramean  land in the historical homeland.
 To raise awareness regarding preservation of the Aramean linguistic, literary and cultural heritage from the systematic and governamental organized Arabization, Turkification, Kurdification, Iranization and Islamisation.
 To counteract the assimilation in the diaspora as well as in the homeland, and constantly work for the union of the Aramean people with the national cause, namely the future land of the Aramean, with the starting point from Lebanon.
 Gathering and return of the Aramean diaspora to the eventual independent state of "Aramea" established in the heartland of the Aramean Nation's historical homeland within present day central Syria.
Reconstituting into Aramean nation, the various diasporic Aramean communities as well as dispersed Aramaic-speaking communities, who have been divided, renamed, misnamed and dispersed throughout the region by the ongoing processes of Arabization, Turkification, Kurdification, Iranization and Islamization. Most of these communities have suffered under constant Arab, Turkish, Kurdish and Persian occupation for centuries and many consider the cultural genocidal campaign of the occupation to be responsible for the varying names, which these communities are known by today.

Flag

See also
 Arameans
 World Council of Arameans (Syriacs)
 List of political parties in Lebanon
 Unrepresented Nations & Peoples Organisation
 Suryoyo Sat

References

External links
Aramean Democratic Organization - Official party site

1988 establishments in Lebanon
Assyrian political parties
Christian democratic parties in Asia
Christian political parties in Lebanon
Conservative parties in Lebanon
National conservative parties
Political parties established in 1988
Political parties in Lebanon
Pro-independence parties
Separatism in Lebanon

Political parties of minorities in Lebanon